Gornești (formerly Ghernesig; ,) is a commune in Mureș County, Transylvania, Romania composed of nine villages:
 Gornești
 Iara de Mureș / Marosjára
 Ilioara / Kisillye
 Mura Mare / Nagyszederjes
 Mura Mică / Kisszederjes
 Pădureni / Erdőcsinád
 Periș / Körtvélyfája
 Petrilaca de Mureș / Magyarpéterlaka
 Teleac / Marostelek

Geography
Gornești lies on the Transylvanian Plateau, on the left bank of the Mureș River. Located in the central part of the county, it is crossed by national road , which connects it to the county seat, Târgu Mureș,  to the south, and to Reghin,  to the north.

History
The commune formed part of the Székely Land region of the historical Transylvania province. Until 1918, it belonged to the Maros-Torda County of the Kingdom of Hungary. After the Hungarian–Romanian War of 1919 and the Treaty of Trianon of 1920, it became part of Romania.

Demographics
Gornești has an absolute Hungarian majority. According to the 2011 census, it has a population of 5,577, of which 71.9% are Hungarian; 18.5% are Romanian, and 9.5% Roma.

Natives
 István Bethlen (1874–1946), aristocrat and statesman, Prime Minister of Hungary from 1921 to 1931
 Sámuel Teleki (1739–1822), Chancellor of Transylvania, famous book collector
 Alexandru Todea (1912–2002), Greek-Catholic bishop of the Alba Iulia Diocese and later cardinal

Economy
The Teleac gas field is located on the territory of the commune; it was discovered in 1915 and began production in 1930.

See also 
 List of Hungarian exonyms (Mureș County)

References

Communes in Mureș County
Localities in Transylvania
Székely communities